Miguel Ángel Jiménez Cedres (born June 18, 1970) is a retired male boxer from Puerto Rico.

He won the silver medal in the men's light-middleweight (– 71 kg) category at the 1991 Pan American Games in Havana, Cuba. In the final, Jiménez was defeated by Cuba's Juan Carlos Lemus. He also represented his native country at the 1992 Summer Olympics in Barcelona, Spain, falling in the first round to Iraqi Furas Hashim.

References
Profile

1970 births
Living people
Light-middleweight boxers
Boxers at the 1991 Pan American Games
Boxers at the 1992 Summer Olympics
Olympic boxers of Puerto Rico
Boxers from Philadelphia
Puerto Rican male boxers
Pan American Games silver medalists for Puerto Rico
Pan American Games medalists in boxing
Medalists at the 1991 Pan American Games
20th-century Puerto Rican people